Mateusz Piotr Bogusz (born 22 August 2001) is a Polish professional footballer who plays as an attacking midfielder for Ibiza, on loan from Premier League club Leeds United. He also represents the Poland national under-21 team. Bogusz started his career at Ekstraklasa side Ruch Chorzów, before signing for Leeds United in January 2019. He made his league debut for the club in July 2020, before spending the 2020–21 and 2021–22 seasons on loan in the Segunda División.

Club career

Ruch Chorzów
Born in Ruda Śląska, Bogusz started his youth career at Polish side Ruch Chorzów before making his first-team debut at 16 years old during the 2017–18 season in I liga on 4 March 2018 in a 2–0 win against Bytovia Bytów.

In 2018, his impressive form for the side meant that Bogusz was offered a trial at Italian Serie A side S.S.C. Napoli, however he was not granted permission by Ruch Chorzów. He made 13 appearances for the side during the 2017–18 season but was unable to prevent Ruch Chorzów being relegated from I liga.

Despite being just 16, he was given the number 10 shirt for the 2018/19 season. He scored his first goal for Ruch Chorzów on 27 October 2018 against Błękitni Stargard. He scored his sixth goal of the II liga season on 19 January 2019 in a 4–1 win against Ruch Radzionków in what appeared to be his final game for the club, as on 22 January 2019, Ruch Chorzów announced that a fee had been agreed with English Championship side Leeds United to sign the player.

Leeds United
Bogusz joined English EFL Championship side Leeds United on 29 January 2019 for an undisclosed fee, signing a two-and-a-half-year contract. He became Leeds' second signing of the 2019 January transfer window after the signing of Kiko Casilla. He was part of Carlos Corberán's Leeds United under 23's side that won the PDL Northern League 2018–19 season, before becoming the national Professional Development League champions following victory over Birmingham City in the final. He was named in the first-team squad for the first time on 28 April 2019 as an unused substitute in a 1–1 draw against Aston Villa and featured on the bench three more times that season.

Bogusz featured in the club's first-team during the pre-season ahead of the 2019–20 season, featuring in 16 Marcelo Bielsa's 16-man squad for Leeds' pre-season tour of Australia for matches against Manchester United and West Sydney Wanderers, and scoring against the latter. He made his senior debut for Leeds on 27 August 2019 in an EFL Cup match against Stoke City, with Leeds losing on 4–5 on penalties after a 2–2 draw in normal time. After the English professional football season was paused in March 2020 due to the COVID-19 pandemic, the season was resumed during June, where Leeds earned promotion to the Premier League as Championship champions for the 2019–20 season, with Bogusz making his league debut for the club in the final game of the season in a 4–0 victory against Charlton Athletic.

His first start of the 2020–21 season came on 16 September 2020 for Premier League Leeds in a 1–1 draw against EFL League One side Hull City in the EFL Cup, with Hull winning 9-8 on penalties. Bogusz was then named as an unused substitute in the following Premier League game against Fulham on 19 September after an injury to Pablo Hernández. Bogusz signed a new three-year contract with Leeds on 11 August 2020. On 5 October 2020, deadline day, Bogusz joined Spanish Segunda División side Logroñés on loan for the 2020–21. He scored once in 24 appearances as the club finished 20th in the league and were relegated.

On 7 July 2021, Bogusz was again loaned out to Spain, this time joining newly-promoted Segunda División side Ibiza on a season-long deal.

On 31 August 2022, Bogusz rejoined Ibiza on loan for the duration of the 2022-23 season.

International career
Bogusz has represented Poland at international level at several age groups. On 13 May 2019, Bogusz was called up to the Poland U20 for the FIFA U-20 World Cup.

On 19 August 2019, Bogusz was called up to the Poland U21s for the first time for matches against Latvia U21 and Estonia U21s in September 2019. With Bogusz making his Poland U21s debut on 10 September against Estonia U21s in a 4–0 win. On 5 September 2020, Bogusz scored his first goals for Poland U21s by scoring a brace in a 6-0 win against Estonia U21s.

Style of play
Bogusz plays mainly as an attacking midfielder in the number 10 role. In Poland he was known for his technical ability and eye for goal. He can also play as a central midfielder or as a deep-lying midfielder.

Career statistics

Honours
Leeds United
EFL Championship: 2019–20

References

External links

2001 births
Living people
Sportspeople from Ruda Śląska
Polish footballers
Poland youth international footballers
Poland under-21 international footballers
Association football midfielders
I liga players
II liga players
English Football League players
Segunda División players
Ruch Chorzów players
Leeds United F.C. players
UD Logroñés players
UD Ibiza players
Polish expatriate footballers
Polish expatriate sportspeople in England
Polish expatriate sportspeople in Spain
Expatriate footballers in England
Expatriate footballers in Spain